Darren Wang Talu (born May 29, 1991) is a Taiwanese actor. He is best known for his breakout role as Hsu Tai-yu in the coming-of-age film, Our Times.

Career 
Wang made his debut in the 2008 drama series Mysterious Incredible Terminator, and went on to make his big-screen bow in the 2010 film In Case of Love. He appeared in the hit high school romance film Our Times in 2015, after which he was crowned GQ's Man of the Year. He has contributed a number of songs to the soundtracks of films he starred in and appeared in The Last Wish (2019).

In 2019, Wang starred as the male lead in the romance film Fall in Love at First Kiss, a remake of the Taiwanese series of the same name.

Filmography

Film

Television series

Variety and reality show

Discography

Awards and nominations

References

External links

1991 births
Living people
Taiwanese male television actors
Taiwanese male film actors
21st-century Taiwanese male actors